Natalia Cimin (born 31 July 1979) is an Italian softball player who competed in the 2004 Summer Olympics.

References

1979 births
Living people
Italian softball players
Olympic softball players of Italy
Softball players at the 2004 Summer Olympics
Place of birth missing (living people)